The 18189 / 18190 Tatanagar - Ernakulam Express is a Express class train operated by the South Eastern Railway of India connecting Ernakulam (Kochi) with the steel-producing city Jamshedpur in Jharkhand state. The Tatanagar- Ernakulam Express is the replacement train of Tatanagar - Alappuzha Express. It covers 2,297 kilometres (1,427 mi) at an average speed of 51 kilometres per hour (32 mph).

Traction

It is hauled by a Arakkonam based WAP-4 Locomotive (End to End) with Top-up of Vijayawada based WDG-3A Twins Locomotives between Rajahmundry & Vijayawada. Top speed permissible is 110 km/h.

Coach Composition

Train Schedule

From Tatanagar Jn to Ernakulam Jn - 18189. The train starts from Tatanagar Jn every Sunday & Thursday.

From Ernakulam Jn to Tatanagar Jn - 18190. The train starts from Tatanagar Jn every Sunday & Wednesday.

References

Express trains in India